Alaigal is a 2001 Indian Tamil-language soap opera on Sun TV. It is a prime time serial. This show had an ensemble cast with Venu Arvind, Jayachitra, Vadivukkarasi, Sri Durga, Reshma, Yuvasri, Viji Chandrasekhar, Absar, S. N. Lakshmi, M.N. Nambiar, Kavithalaya Krishnan, Vanitha Krishnachandran, Manjari, Alaigal Rani, M. S. Bhaskar, Nizhalgal Ravi, Mohan Vaidya, Murali Kumar, Rajesh, Alaigal Rani, Vishwa, Daniel Balaji and Raghav. The show is produced by Vikatan Televistas Pvt. Ltd and director by Sundar K Vijayan. It was aired on every Monday to Friday.

Plot
Chandrasekar-Kalyani are the parents of three children: Kannan, Vijay and Raji. Chandrasekar had an elder brother. After the death of the latter, their three children are orphaned and stay with Chandrasekhar. Ramu, the eldest of the three, is a married to sita, a woman of virtue. The couple, however, is treated like unpaid servants by Kalyani. The second one is Gayatri, who works as a teacher in a school. The youngest is Anand, a press photographer. Kalyani hates the three and makes them dance to her tunes.

At this stage, the character Ranga a notorious, anti-social element is introduced. He is shocked at seeing Kalyani in a shop. The very reason for Rangs's turning an anti-social is Kalyani. He decided to take revenge on her now and shatter her family. He arranges for a drama, which unfolds as below. Ranga and Gayatri get married in a temple. Gayatri goes to live with Ranga. Gayatri, in her new home, encounters the other side of Ranga. He injects steroids, instead of insulin, to her and thereby tarnishes her reputation in society. 
At the same time, he continues to play the role of saviour at Vijay's family tactfully. Ranga hires Murali, makes the latter 'prove' his extra-marital connections with Gayatri.

The family fall into the trap and curse Gayatri, who is depressed. To stop this, Ranga plots to kill Gayatri, but she escapes. Everybody is made to believe that Gayatri has eloped with Murali. Anand, the press photographer, falls in love with Sindu. Sindu is born to Krishna, and estate owners, and Sakunthala. She has a brother named Hari. Sakuntala loves money than her husband, and seeds of separation have been sown. Krishna transfers his entire properties to his wife's name and leaves the house. Sindu follows her father. Krishna comes into contact with Savitri. She consoles him and takes care of the child Sindhu, too. Hard work makes Krishna the owner again of a tea estate.

At this juncture, Sindu loves Anand and wants to marry him. Savitri agrees to this, though reluctant at first. Meanwhile, Ranga is continuing his search for Sowmya. Kalyani settles for a girl to be wed to her son Vijay. But he turns it down saying he loves Sowmya. Unable to hide his love, Vijay decides to wed Sowmya, after seeking the blessings of his father. Vijay, who feels Ranga can solve problems, introduces him to Sowmya and there is a huge shock. Sowmya fumes on seeing Ranga who spoiled her family. But there is a catch. To Vijay, Ranga is a godfather, and he would not allow anything said against Ranga. Sowmya senses that Ranga intends to shatter the entire family. Sowmya must save the family and expose him.

Cast

Main cast
 Venu Arvind as Rangarajan (Ranga / Raja), Savithri's son, Gayathri's husband and baby savithri's father
 Reshma (Epi 1-86) / Sri Durga (Epi 90-403) as Sowmiya Vijay, (Vijay's wife)
 Yuvasri as Gayathri Rangarajan / Jansi (Ranga's wife, Rajashekar's daughter and baby Savithri's mother)
 Jayachitra as Savitri Easwaramoorthy, Rajashekar and Chandrashekar's sister, Ranga's and Bala's mother
 Vadivukkarasi as Kalyani Chandrashekar 
 A. L. Raghavan as Chandrasekar, Savithri's and Rajashekar's younger brother
 Kavithalaya Krishnan in a dual role as Ramamoorthy Rajashekar / Rajasekhar, Savithri's younger brother
 Absar as Vijay Chandrashekar, Kalyani's son and Soumiya's husband
 Nithya Ravindran (Epi 1-31) / Vanitha Krishnachandran (Epi 32-403) as Seetha Ramu (Ramu's wife)
 M. N. Nambiar as Father (Acha), caretaker of Ranga, Dharma and others in Nesam ashram
 Nizhalgal Ravi as Easwaramoorthy, Savithri's husband (Ranga's and Bala's father)
 Rajesh as Krishnan (Sakunthala's husband)
 S. N. Lakshmi as Chandrasekhar, Rajasekhar and Savithri's mother
 Murali Kumar as Kannan Chandrashekar, Kalyani's son 
 Viji Chandrasekhar as Radha Kannan (Kannan's wife and Kalyani's daughter-in-law)
 Manjari as Sindhu Anand (Savithri's adopted daughter, Krishna's daughter, Anand's wife)
 Shakthhi Kumar as Anand Rajashekar (Rajashekar's son, Sindhu's husband)
 Alaigal Rani as Raji Chandrashekar (Kalyani's daughter)

Recurring cast
 M. S. Bhaskar as Mouli (Brother of Kalyani)
 Raaghav as Raja, Krishna's adopted son (told to act as Savithri's son)
K. S. Jayalakshmi as Shakuntala, Krishna's wife
 Mohan Vaidya as Dubbuku Das (Security guard arranged by Ranga to spy on Soumiya)
Vishwa as Hari (Sindhu's brother)
 Golden Suresh as Bala (Sindhu's adopted brother and Ranga's brother)
 Daniel Balaji as Dharma, Ranga's aide and close friend
 Kavin (Devaguru) as Rahul, Radha's former lover, Raji's husband
 Amitha as Varsha (Ranga's worker who creates differences between Vijay and Soumya) 
Sukumari as Dakshayani Amma 
 Srilekha Rajendran as Bama (Soumiya's step-mother)
 Auditor Sridhar as Dhanraj (Anu's father)
 Dinky as Anu (Dhanraj's daughter and bala's fiancee)
 Ganga. K as Murali
 Madurai Jayanthi as Ranga's housemaid
 Muthu Subramaniyam as Sivalingam Soumiya's father
 Sampath as Sampath (Soumiya's first husband who is a fraud)
 Master Naveen as Ramu's son
 Baby Prahisitha as Baby Sindhu
 Master Roshan as young Raja
 Master Prasanna Sundar as young Raja
 Baby Shambhavi
 Aruna as Aruna, Sindhu's hostel mate (uncredited)
 Madurai Nambi
 Railway Vijayakumar

Soundtrack

Airing history 
Alaigal is a television soap operas which aired on Sun TV. It premiered on 29 October 2001 at 7:30 p.m. On 11 February 2002 a show named Indhira replaced it in that time slot and Alaigal was moved to 9:00 p.m.
Vikatan started airing the serial in their YouTube channel from April 6, 2020. Due to popular demand they started airing two episodes per day from 21 April 2020 and ended on 22nd October 2020.

Awards and honours

See also
 List of programs broadcast by Sun TV
 List of TV shows aired on Sun TV (India)

References

External links
 

2001 Tamil-language television series debuts
2003 Tamil-language television series endings
Sun TV original programming
Tamil-language television shows
Television shows set in Tamil Nadu
Tamil-language melodrama television series